Narendra Jha (21 January 1964  14 March 2018) was an Indian actor. He was known for his work in Bollywood productions; his most noted films being Haider, Raees, Ghayal Once Again, Hamari Adhuri Kahani, Mohenjodaro, Shorgul, My Father Iqbal, Force 2, Kaabil, 2016 The End and Doordarshan's Shanti. He last appeared in the action film Race 3. He is known for playing antagonist roles in mythological serials like Ravana and Arjuna.

Career
Narendra Jha had studied ancient history for his post-graduation in JNU where he also prepared for civil services, according to a blog written by journalist and writer Avijit Ghosh (Cinema Bhojpuri, 40 Retakes), who was his junior at the central university. As a child, Jha used to act in village plays in Madhubani, the blog says. But his professional journey as an actor began in 1992 when he enrolled in SRCC acting diploma course. When he came to Mumbai, he was flooded with modeling offers and he became a popular face of the ad world. Having done more than 20 TV serials, he was finalized to play an important role in the 2002 realised movie Funtoosh. The next year he was cast to play Habibur Rahman in the film Netaji Subhas Chandra Bose: The Forgotten Hero directed by Shyam Benegal. However, this association with Benegal continued and he again cast Jha to play Mohammed Ali Jinnah in Samvidhaan.

Death
Jha had suffered a heart attack previously and on doctor's request had moved to Panvel in his Farmhouse with his wife. Jha died at his farmhouse in Nashik early on 14 March 2018 after suffering a massive heart attack. He was 54 years old.

Filmography

Films

Television

References

External links
 
 

1962 births
2018 deaths
Indian male television actors
Indian male film actors
20th-century Indian male actors
People from Madhubani, India
21st-century Indian male actors